Chuang Ming-yao (16 November 1929 – 6 January 2002) was a Taiwanese admiral, diplomat, and politician. 

Chuang served as the Vice Minister of National Defense under Chen Li-an and was named commander of the Republic of China Navy in 1992. He stepped down from that position in 1994 as a result of the La Fayette-class frigate scandal. Two years later, Chuang was selected to lead the Taipei Economic and Cultural Representative Office in Japan. In May 2000, he was named the Secretary-General of the National Security Council. 

He died in 2002 of liver cancer at the age of 72, while being treated at Taipei Veterans General Hospital.

References

1938 births
2002 deaths
Deaths from cancer in Taiwan
Deaths from liver cancer
Republic of China Navy admirals
Politicians of the Republic of China on Taiwan from Kaohsiung
Representatives of Taiwan to Japan
Taiwanese Ministers of National Defense